Eccellenza Emilia-Romagna is the regional Eccellenza football division for clubs in Emilia-Romagna, Italy. It is competed amongst 36 teams, in two different groups (A and B). The winners of the Groups are promoted to Serie D. The club who finishes second also have the chance to gain promotion, they are entered into a national play-off which consists of two rounds.

Champions
Here are the past champions of the Emilia-Romagna Eccellenza, organised into their respective group.

Group A

1991–92 Fidenza
1992–93 Reggiolo
1993–94 Sassolese San Giorgio
1994–95 Mantova
1995–96 Virtus Pavullese
1996–97 Virtus Castelfranco
1997–98 Casalese
1998–99 Bagnolese
1999–2000 Poggese
2000–01 Lentigione
2001–02 Virtus Pavullese
2002–03 Bagnolese
2003–04 Virtus Castelfranco
2004–05 Castellarano
2005–06 Fidenza
2006–07 Crociati Parma
2007–08 Fiorenzuola
2008–09 Dorando Pietri
2009–10 Bagnolese
2010–11 BettolaPonte
2011–12 Formigine
2012–13 Piacenza
2013–14 Fiorenzuola
2014–15 Lentigione
2015–16 Castelvetro
2016–17 Vigor Carpaneto
2017–18 Axys Zola
2018–19 Correggese
2019–20 Bagnolese
2020–21 Borgo San Donnino
2021–22 Corticella

Group B

1991–92 Argentana
1992–93 San Marino
1993–94 Imola
1994–95 Iperzola
1995–96 Boca Bologna
1996–97 San Marino
1997–98 Russi
1998–99 Bellaria Igea Marina
1999–2000 Mezzolara
2000–01 Boca Bologna
2001–02 Ravenna
2002–03 Cattolica
2003–04 Reno Centese
2004–05 Cervia
2005–06 Giacomense
2006–07 Real Cesenatico
2007–08 Comacchio Lidi
2008–09 Valleverde Riccione
2009–10 Forlì
2010–11 Riccione
2011–12 Castenaso
2012–13 Romagna Centro
2013–14 Ribelle Castiglione
2014–15 Sammaurese
2015–16 Alfonsine
2016–17 Rimini
2017–18 Savignanese
2018–19 Alfonsine
2019–20 Marignanese
2020–21 Not awarded
2021–22 Fya Riccione

References

External links
Some Club Histories In the League

Sport in Emilia-Romagna
Emi
Sports leagues established in 1991
1991 establishments in Italy
Football clubs in Italy
Association football clubs established in 1991